This is a list of famous and notable people from Madhya Pradesh, India. This would include persons who are known to a large number of people and is based on the extent of their popularity. Their fame could be brief, what matters is that they were well known during the peak of their popularity.

Rulers and Generals

Ancient
Yashodharman

Medieval
Nagabhata I
Nagabhata II
Mihira Bhoja
Lakshmikarna
Hammiravarman
Rahila
Yashovarman
Dhanga
Vidyadhara
Madanavarman
Bhoja
Devapala
Mahalakadeva

Freedom fighters 
 Chandra Shekhar Azad
 Ravishankar Shukla
 Tatya Tope
 Rani Lakshmi Bai
 Rani Avanti Bai
 Tantya Bheel (Tantya Mama)
 Jhalkari Bai

Scientists
 Narendra Karmarkar, Gwalior 
 Anil Kakodkar, Barwani

Business
 Ramesh Chandra Agarwal

Nobel Laureates
 Kailash Satyarthi

Craftspeople 
Abdul Kadar Khatri (1961 - 2019) Master Craftsman
 Mohammed Yusuf Khatri

Sport medal Winners 
 Sita Sahu
 Varsha Varman
 Aditya Joshi
 Satendra Singh Lohiya

Medicine
 Hakim Syed Zillur Rahman, Bhopal born scholar of Unani medicine
 Keshavrao Krishnarao Datey cardiologist

Chief Justices of India
J.S.Verma
Ramesh Chandra Lahoti

Governor of RBI 
Raghuram Rajan

Hindi and Urdu literature
 Makhanlal Chaturvedi
 Nathuram Premi
 Ramkumar Verma
 Gajanan Madhav Muktibodh
 Harishankar Parsai
 Sharad Joshi
 Rahat Indori
 Rajneesh
 Bihari Lal
 Abdul Qavi Desnavi
 Rahat Indori
 Kaif Bhopali
 Uday Prakash
 Seth Govind Das
 Hari Krishna Devsare
 Nida Fazli
 Anupam Mishra
 Balachandra Shastri
 Vidya Shah
 Mrinal Pande
 Vagish Shastri
 Khurram Murad
 Bhagwan Datt Sharma

Journalists 
 Makhanlal Chaturvedi
 Nathuram Premi
 Mrinal Pande
 Prabhash Joshi
 Deepak Chaurasia

Bollywood
Ami Mishra
Anil Mange
Arjun Rampal
 Arunoday Singh
 Ashok Kumar
Ashutosh Rana
 Lata Mangeshkar
Javed Khan
Johnny Walker
 Jaya Bachchan
 Salim Khan
 Salman Khan
 Praveen Morchhale
 Sharat Saxena
 Kumar Pallana
 Raghuvir Yadav
 Mamta Sharma
 Arjun Rampal
 Swanand Kirkire
 Govind Namdev
 Ashutosh Rana
 Mukesh Tiwari
 Shaan
 Sara Khan
 Himangini Singh Yadu
 Sharad Kelkar
 Divyanka Tripathi
 Annu Kapoor
 Rajeev Verma
 Mushtaq Khan
 Razak Khan
 Sachin Nayak
 Palak Muchhal
 Rishiking
 Kartik Aaryan
 Vinay Sapru writer, director, producer
 Paridhi Sharma
 Sunil Lahri
 Ananya Khare
 Aishwarya Khare
 Kritika Kamra

Politics
 B.R. Ambedkar
 Shankar Dayal Sharma, former President of India
 Atal Bihari Vajpayee, former PM of India
 Kailash Nath Katju
 Vijaya Raje Scindia
 Madhavrao Scindia, former Union Minister
 Paras Chandra Jain, Energy Minister, Government of Madhya Pradesh
 Kailash Vijayvargiya, BJP National General Secretary
 Kamal Patel, former Minister, Government of Madhya Pradesh
 Arjun Singh, politician
 Vasundhara Raje
 Sharad Yadav
 Jaya Bachchan
 Sumitra Mahajan
 Jyotiraditya Madhavrao Scindia
 Prithviraj Chavan
 Shivraj Singh Chouhan, current chief minister
 Uma Bharti
 Digvijaya Singh
 Satish Kumar Sharma, politician

Hockey
 Roop Singh
 Ahmed Khan
 Aslam Sher Khan
 Shivendra Singh
 Shankar Laxman

Cricket
Mansoor Ali Khan Pataudi
Mushtaq Ali
Chandu Sarwate, former India cricketer.
Amay Khurasiya, former India cricketer.
Narendra Hirwani, former India cricketer.
C. K. Nayudu
Sanjay Jagdale
Narendra Menon
Sudhir Asnani
Rahul Dravid, Indian cricketer born in Indore.
 Amay Khurasiya
 Jai Prakash Yadav
 Naman Ojha
 Devendra Bundela
Nuzhat Parween
 Ishwar Pandey

Militants
Safdar Nagori

Skiing
Himanshu Thakur

See also
 List of people by India state

References

People
People from Madhya Pradesh
Madhya Pradesh
Madhya Pradesh
Madhya Pradesh